Preston is an unincorporated community in Bath County, Kentucky, United States. Its elevation is 758 feet and it is in the Eastern Time Zone. Preston's zip code is 40366.

References

Unincorporated communities in Bath County, Kentucky
Unincorporated communities in Kentucky